Nana Odame Kusi (born 11 June 1943) is a Ghanaian politician and a member of the first parliament of the fourth Republic representing the Fomena constituency in the Ashanti Region of Ghana. He was a member of the National Democratic Congress.

Early life and education
Kusi was born on 11 June 1943 in the Ashanti Region of Ghana. He attended the Takoradi Technical Institute, where he received his GCE Ordinary Level Certificate, the Tarkwa School  of Mines (now the George Grant University of Mines and Technology), where he obtained his Diploma in Electrical engineering, and the School of Royal Electrical and Mechanical Engineers (now the Defence School of Electro-Mechanical Engineering), where he qualified  as a Practice Artificer equivalent to a Higher National Certificate.

Politics
He was elected into parliament on the ticket of the National Democratic Congress for the Fomena Constituency in the Ashanti Region of Ghana during the 1992 Ghanaian parliamentary election. He polled 3,678 votes out of the total valid votes cast. He was succeeded by Akwasi Afrifa of the New Patriotic Party  during the 1996 Ghanaian general elections.

Career
He is an auctioneer and a farmer by profession and a former member of parliament for the Fomena Constituency in the Ashanti Region of Ghana.

Personal  life
He is a Christian.

References

Living people
1943 births
National Democratic Congress (Ghana) politicians
Female auctioneers
Takoradi Technical University alumni
Ghanaian MPs 1993–1997
Ghanaian farmers
People from Ashanti Region
Ghanaian Christians
21st-century Ghanaian politicians